Sidney Bracey (born Sidney Bracy; 18 December 1877 – 5 August 1942) was an Australian-born American actor. After a stage career in Australia, on Broadway and in Britain, he performed in more than 320 films between 1909 and 1942.

Early life and stage career
Bracey was born in Melbourne, Victoria, with the name Sidney Bracy, later changing the spelling of his last name.  He was the son of Welsh tenor Henry Bracy and English actress Clara T. Bracy.  His aunt was the actress and dancer Lydia Thompson. He was educated at Melbourne University.

He began his stage career in Australia in the 1890s, with J. C. Williamson's comic opera companies. On Broadway, in 1900, he appeared as the tenor lead, Yussuf, in the first American production of The Rose of Persia at Daly's Theatre in New York.  He then moved to England, appearing as Moreno in the Edwardian musical comedy hit The Toreador at the Gaiety Theatre, London in June 1901.  He next joined the D'Oyly Carte Opera Company on tour in Britain, playing Terence O'Brian in The Emerald Isle from September 1901 to May 1902.  He continued his stage career in Britain in Amorelle at London's Comedy Theatre in 1904, The Winter's Tale in 1904–05, and A Persian Princess at Queen's Theatre in 1909, and also played roles in Shakespeare plays on Broadway in 1904 and 1905. Back on Broadway, in 1912, he played Sir Guy of Gisborne in a revival of Reginald de Koven's Robin Hood at the New Amsterdam Theatre, followed by Rob Roy at the Liberty Theatre in 1913.

Film career
Bracey then moved into film acting, making first silent films and then "talkies", until his death in 1942, while also performing in live acts together with friends such as Frank Farrington and James Cruze. Early in his film career, from 1913 to 1915, he worked for the Thanhouser Company in dozens of films, often playing butler roles, such as in The Million Dollar Mystery. There he co-wrote and directed a silent movie called Sid Nee's Finish (1914), in which he played the title character. In 1914, he married Evelyn Forshay. After Thanhouser, he worked with several major studios. By 1916, he changed the spelling of his last name to "Bracey". Silent film authority Diane MacIntyre gave this description of him: "Bracey, a stately looking character man, was in big demand for authority like roles; such as movie directors, bosses and, most of the time, the most respectable and poised butler in all of Hollywood. He was thin, dark haired and had an earnest, yet sober, face that could break into a look of wide-eyed exasperation."

Bracey died in Hollywood, California, on 5 August 1942, aged 64. He was buried in Calvary Cemetery in East Los Angeles.

Selected filmography

 Adrift in a Great City (1914 short)
 The Million Dollar Mystery (1914)
 The Man Inside (1916)
 Merely Mary Ann (1916)
 A Huntress of Men (1916)
 Caprice of the Mountains (1916)
 The Ragged Princess (1916)
 Crime and Punishment (1917)
 A Man's World (1918)
 The Invisible Ray (1920 serial)
 An Amateur Devil (1920)
 Food for Scandal (1920)
 Passion Fruit (1921)
 The Outside Woman (1921)
 The March Hare (1921)
 Crazy to Marry (1921)
 Morals (1921)
 Midnight (1922)
 The Dictator (1922)
 The Radio King (1922)
 One Wonderful Night (1922)
 The Social Buccaneer (1923)
 Merry-Go-Round (1923)
 Ruggles of Red Gap (1923)
 The Courtship of Miles Standish (1923)
 The Wild Party (1923)
 Why Men Leave Home (1924)
 Her Night of Romance (1924)
 By Divine Right (1924)
 So This Is Marriage (1924)
 The White Desert (1925)
 A Slave of Fashion (1925)
 The Merry Widow (1925)
 Wandering Footsteps (1925)
 The Blackbird (1926)
 A Bankrupt Honeymoon (1926)
 The Devil's Circus (1926)
 Beverly of Graustark (1926)
 A Man Four-Square (1926)
 Paris (1926)
 The Mystery Club (1926)
 The Thirteenth Juror (1927)
 Birds of Prey (1927)
 The Woman on Trial (1927)
 The Cameraman (1928)
 The Cossacks (1928)
 Home, James (1928)
 Man-Made Women (1928)
 Win That Girl (1928)
 The Haunted House (1928)
 Show People (1928)
 His Captive Woman (1929)
 Sioux Blood (1929)
 Children of Pleasure (1930)
 Outside the Law (1930)
 The Lion and the Lamb (1931)
 Shanghaied Love (1931)
 A Dangerous Affair (1931)
 New Adventures of Get Rich Quick Wallingford (1931)
 The Monster Walks (1932)
 Love Bound (1932)
 The Intruder (1933)
 What! No Beer? (1933)
 Broken Dreams (1933)
 The Woman Who Dared (1933)
 The Ninth Guest (1934)
 Eight Bells (1935)
 I've Been Around (1935)
 Anna Karenina (1935)
 Second Childhood (1936)
 Isle of Fury (1936) as Sam
 Three Smart Boys (1937)
 Merrily We Live (1938)
 My Bill (1938)
 The Sun Never Sets  (1939)
 Devil's Island (1939)
 On Trial (1939)
 King of the Underworld (1939)
 Affectionately Yours (1941)
 The Body Disappears (1941)

References

External links

1877 births
1942 deaths
American male film actors
Male actors from Melbourne
Australian emigrants to the United States
20th-century American male actors